Komba Claudius Gbamanja (1925 - 2009) was a Sierra Leonean politician from the opposition Sierra Leone People's Party. He a member of parliament of Sierra Leone representing the Kono District. He is a member of the Kono ethnic group.

References

Members of the Parliament of Sierra Leone
2009 deaths
Sierra Leone People's Party politicians
1925 births